43rd New York Film Critics Circle Awards
January 29, 1978
(announced December 21, 1977)

Best Picture: 
 Annie Hall 
The 43rd New York Film Critics Circle Awards, 29 January 1978, honored the best filmmaking of 1977.

Winners
Best Actor:
John Gielgud - Providence
Runners-up: Fernando Rey - That Obscure Object of Desire (Cet obscur objet du désir) and John Travolta - Saturday Night Fever
Best Actress:
Diane Keaton - Annie Hall
Runners-up: Shelley Duvall - 3 Women and Diane Keaton - Looking for Mr. Goodbar
Best Director:
Woody Allen - Annie Hall
Runners-up: Luis Buñuel - That Obscure Object of Desire (Cet obscur objet du désir) and Steven Spielberg - Close Encounters of the Third Kind
Best Film:
Annie Hall
Runners-up: That Obscure Object of Desire (Cet obscur objet du désir) and Close Encounters of the Third Kind
Best Screenplay:
Woody Allen and Marshall Brickman - Annie Hall
Runner-up: Luis Buñuel and Jean-Claude Carrière - That Obscure Object of Desire (Cet obscur objet du désir)
Best Supporting Actor:
Maximilian Schell - Julia
Runners-up: Bill Macy - The Late Show and David Hemmings - Islands in the Stream
Best Supporting Actress:
Sissy Spacek - 3 Women
Runners-up: Vanessa Redgrave - Julia and Donna Pescow - Saturday Night Fever

References

External links
1977 Awards

1977
New York Film Critics Circle Awards, 1977
New York Film Critics Circle Awards
New York
New York Film Critics Circle Awards
New York Film Critics Circle Awards